Luigi Ciriaco De Mita (2 February 1928 – 26 May 2022) was an Italian politician who served as Prime Minister of Italy from April 1988 to July 1989.

A member of the Christian Democracy (DC), De Mita served as its secretary and leader from May 1982 until February 1989, becoming one of the most influential politicians in the country, as well as one of the most prominent members of DC's left-wing. During his long-time career, he also served as Minister of Industry, Commerce and Crafts from 1973 to 1974, Minister of Foreign Trade from 1974 to 1976 and Minister for Interventions in the South from 1976 until 1979. He had been a member of the Chamber of Deputies for more than 40 years between 1963 and 2008 and also member of the European Parliament. In recent years, De Mita served as mayor of his hometown Nusco from 2014 until his death in 2022.

Early life and studies
Ciriaco De Mita was born in Nusco in the Avellinese hinterland in 1928. His father was a tailor and postman, while his mother was a housewife. After attending the classical high school in nearby Sant'Angelo dei Lombardi with excellent grades, he won a scholarship in the Augustinianum College and enrolled at the Catholic University of the Sacred Heart in Milan, where he graduated in law and then started working as a consultant at Enrico Mattei's Eni legal office.

Political career

As a young man, De Mita joined the Christian Democracy (DC) and entered politics. In 1953, De Mita was among the proponents of "La Base", a leftist wing of the party, close to Giovanni Marcora. He rose through the ranks of the party, becoming a member of its national council in 1956 during the party's congress in Trento.

In the 1963 general election, he was elected to the Chamber of Deputies  for the constituency of Benevento–Avellino–Salerno with more than 67,000 votes. and he will be a deputy uninterruptedly until the elections of 1994. In 1968 De Mita was appointed undersecretary of state to the Ministry of Interior, becoming a member of the government for the first time. 

De Mita was appointed deputy secretary of the Christian Democracy in 1969, serving under the leadership of Arnaldo Forlani; he hold the position until February 1973. During the 1970s, De Mita hold various positions in the government. He served in the cabinet of Mariano Rumor as Minister of Industry, Trade and Crafts from 8 July 1973 until 23 November 1974; Minister of Foreign Trade from 23 November 1974 to 30 July 1976 in the government of Aldo Moro and Minister for Extraordinary Interventions in Southern Italy in the cabinet of Giulio Andreotti from 30 July 1976 to 21 March 1979.

Secretary of the Christian Democracy
In the 1982 party congress, De Mita was elected secretary of the Christian Democracy with a clear objective of renewing the party. As party's leader, De Mita suffered a huge loss in the 1983 general election. In 1986, De Mita was re-elected secretary with 60% support from the party.

His secretariat is remembered for a rivalry with Bettino Craxi, socialist leader who in the 1980s held the office of Prime Minister for four years. Craxi had always promoted his reformist drive as opposed to the inaction of the Christian democrats and in 1987 he clashed with De Mita for the breaking of the so-called "relay pact" (patto della staffetta), under which the Italian Socialist Party (PSI) would have had to cede the leadership of the government to the DC in the last year of the legislature. Craxi refused to do this and in 1987 a snap election was called.

In 1984 De Mita pushed the future president of Italy, Sergio Mattarella, and Leoluca Orlando to intensify their political commitment with the task of cleaning up the Sicilian branch of the DC from Mafia control. De Mita appointed Mattarella as extraordinary commissioner for Palermo.

De Mita remained secretary of the PD until 22 February 1989, when he became president of the party, a position he held until 1992.

Prime Minister of Italy

After the elections of 1987, De Mita waited a year to become Prime Minister and was appointed on 13 April 1988, heading a Pentapartito with DC, PSI, PSDI, PRI and PLI. Three days later, on 16 April 1988, in Forlì, Red Brigades killed Senator Roberto Ruffilli, an advisor of De Mita.  De Mita's government obtained a vote of confidence from the Chamber of Deputies on 21 April, government that had as its main objective the reform of the institutions based on four urgent points: the Italian Parliament, the presidency of the Council of Ministers, local entities and the rules of procedure of the Chamber of Deputies.

In June 1988 his cabinet approved the relocation of 72 U.S. Air Force F-16 fighters to Italy, in response to Spain's request to remove them from its territory.

In social policy, De Mita's time in office witnessed the passage of a law in May 1988 that introduced a new benefit for salaried workers called "benefit for the family nucleus" (assegno per il nucleo familiare), with the amount varying depending on the number of family members and the family income of the previous year.

After a government crisis caused by rivalry with Craxi, De Mita resigned on 19 May 1989. He was called to form a new coalition government, but did not succeed. His government finally fell in July 1989 and was succeeded by Giulio Andreotti on 23 July.

Later political roles

In September 1992, he was appointed Chairman of the Bilateral Commission for Constitutional Reform, a position he left in March 1993 when was succeeded by Nilde Iotti.  In the 1994 elections, De Mita did not run for reelection as a deputy, but ran again in 1996 after a lag of two years and then re-elected in 2001 and 2006. He then joined the Italian People's Party and later Democracy is Freedom – The Daisy until 2008.

De Mita was Member of the European Parliament between 1999 and 2004, and 2009 to 2014.

On 25 May 2014, De Mita was elected as mayor of Nusco, his native town, and re-elected in 2019, serving until his death in 2022.

Personal life and death
In 1958, De Mita married Anna Maria Scarinzi (born 12 February 1939), with whom he had one son and three daughters, Antonia (born 23 December 1967), Giuseppe (born 10 May 1969), Floriana (born 19 March 1973), and Simona (born 21 April 1974). His nephew Giuseppe De Mita was member of the Chamber of Deputies between 2013 and 2018, and whose political career Ciriaco was in charge of catapulting. 

De Mita died on 26 May 2022, at the age of 94, while recovering from surgery for a fracture of a femur following a fall at home. His funeral was held the following day in Nusco.

Electoral history

Source: Ministry of the Interior

References

1928 births
2022 deaths
Accidental deaths in Italy
Accidental deaths from falls
People from the Province of Avellino
Italian Roman Catholics
Christian Democracy (Italy) politicians
Italian People's Party (1994) politicians
Democracy is Freedom – The Daisy politicians
Democratic Party (Italy) politicians
Union of the Centre (2002) politicians
Prime Ministers of Italy
Government ministers of Italy
Deputies of Legislature IV of Italy
Deputies of Legislature V of Italy
Deputies of Legislature VI of Italy
Deputies of Legislature VII of Italy
Deputies of Legislature VIII of Italy
Deputies of Legislature IX of Italy
Deputies of Legislature X of Italy
Deputies of Legislature XI of Italy
Deputies of Legislature XIII of Italy
Deputies of Legislature XIV of Italy
Deputies of Legislature XV of Italy
Union of the Centre (2002) MEPs
MEPs for Italy 2009–2014
Università Cattolica del Sacro Cuore alumni